Susie Baumer (born 31 March 1966) is a retired Australian freestyle swimmer. She competed at the 1984 Summer Olympics and the 1988 Summer Olympics.

References

External links
 

1966 births
Living people
Olympic swimmers of Australia
Swimmers at the 1984 Summer Olympics
Swimmers at the 1988 Summer Olympics
Place of birth missing (living people)
Commonwealth Games medallists in swimming
Commonwealth Games gold medallists for Australia
Commonwealth Games silver medallists for Australia
Commonwealth Games bronze medallists for Australia
Swimmers at the 1986 Commonwealth Games
Australian female freestyle swimmers
20th-century Australian women
21st-century Australian women
Medallists at the 1986 Commonwealth Games